Ferdinand Raimund (born Ferdinand Jakob Raimann; 1 June 1790 – 5 September 1836, Pottenstein, Lower Austria) was an Austrian actor and dramatist.

Life and work 
He was born in Vienna as a son of Bohemian woodturning master craftsman Jakob Raimann. In 1811, he acted at the Theater in der Josefstadt, and, in 1817 at the Leopoldstädter Theater. In 1823 he produced his first play, Der Barometermacher auf der Zauberinsel, which was followed by Der Diamant des Geisterkönigs (1824). The still popular Bauer als Millionär (1826), Der Alpenkönig und der Menschenfeind (1828) and Der Verschwender (1834), incidental music by Conradin Kreutzer, are Raimund's masterpieces. Raimund's comedies are still frequently performed in Germany and Austria.

When Raimund was bitten by a dog, which he falsely believed to be rabid, he shot himself on 29 August 1836 and died on 5 September 1836 in Pottenstein, aged 46. Raimund is buried in Gutenstein, which features a Raimund memorial.

Raimund was a master of the Viennese Posse or farce; his rich humour is seen to best advantage in his realistic portraits of his fellow citizens. The Raimund Theater in Vienna is named after him.

Works 
 , 1823 (The Barometer-Maker on the Magic Island translated by Edmund Kimbell)
 , 1824 (The Diamond of the Spirit King translated by Edmund Kimbell)
 , 1826
 , 1828
 , 1827
 , 1828 (The King of the Alps translated by John Baldwin Buckstone Free full text online)
  oder König ohne Reich, Held ohne Mut, Schönheit ohne Jugend, 1829
 , 1834 (The Spendthrift translated by Erwin Tramer), adapted as film The Spendthrift (1953)

References

Bibliography 
 Ferdinand Raimunds sämmtliche Werke (with biography by ) appeared in 4 volumes. (1837); they have been also edited by K. Glossy and A. Sauer (4 vols., 1881; 2nd ed., 1891), and a selection by E. Castle (1903). See E. Schmidt in Charakteristiken, vol. I. (1886); A. Farinelli, Grillparzer und Raimund (1897); L. A. Frankl, Zur Biographie F. Raimunds (1884); and especially A. Sauer's article in the Allgemeine Deutsche Biographie.

External links 

 
 
 

19th-century Austrian male actors
19th-century Austrian people
Biedermeier writers
Austrian male stage actors
Austrian male dramatists and playwrights
Austrian people of German Bohemian descent
Writers from Vienna
Dog attack victims
1790 births
1836 deaths
Suicides by firearm in Austria
19th-century Austrian dramatists and playwrights
19th-century Austrian male writers
1830s suicides